Shingu may refer to:

Cities and places

Iran
 - Shīngū
Shingu, Iran, a village in Kohurestan Rural District, in the Central District of Khamir County, Hormozgan Province

Japan

 Shingū, Ehime (新宮村), a former village located in Uma District, Ehime Prefecture, now part of the city of Shikokuchūō
 Shingū, Fukuoka (新宮町), a town located in Kasuya District, Fukuoka Prefecture
 Shingū, Hyōgo (新宮町), a town located in Ibo District, Hyōgo Prefecture, now part of the city of Tatsuno
 Shingū Station, a railway station in Shingū, Wakayama Prefecture
 Shingū, Wakayama (新宮市), a city located in Wakayama Prefecture
 Shingū-Chūō Station, a railway station on the Kagoshima Main Line, in Shingū, Fukuoka

Pakistan
 Shingu Charpa, a mountain in the Hushe Region

Entertainment
 Shingu: Secret of the Stellar Wars, anime series